Xanthostemon eucalyptoides is a tree species in the family Myrtaceae that is endemic to Australia.

It blooms between June and July producing cream coloured flowers. The stem has a cream or pale brown colour with brittle stripes usually visible in the outer blaze. The stem is covered in flaky grey bark. The leaves are discolorous with an elliptic shape with a base that is obtuse to cordate and an apex that is obtuse or emarginate.

The tree has a typical lifespan of over 20 years forming seeds after 10 years. It has a lignotuber and will resprout basally following fire.
 
It is found in along watercourses in the east Kimberley region of Western Australia between the Prince Regent National Park and Wyndham where it grows in rocky sandstone-based soils. The plants range extends into the Northern Territory, from the Western Australian border as far east as the Arnhem Land plateau and south to about Pine Creek.

The species was first formally described by the botanist Ferdinand von Mueller in 1859 as part of the work Fragmenta Phytographiae Australiae. Other synonyms include Metrosideros eucalyptoides, Nania eucalyptoides and Nania eucalyptodes.

References

eucalyptoides
Rosids of Western Australia
Plants described in 1859
Flora of the Northern Territory
Taxa named by Ferdinand von Mueller